The Naga Hills, reaching a height of around , lie on the border of India and Burma (Myanmar). They are part of a complex mountain system, and the parts of the mountain ranges  inside the Indian state of Nagaland and the Burmese Naga Self-Administered Zone are called the Naga Hills. The highest point of the Naga hills is Mount Saramati (3826 m).

Etymology
The term "Naga" refers to the Naga people, who were called "Naga" or "Naka" in the Burmese language, meaning "people with pierced ears".

History
In British India, the major part of the hills came under the Naga Hills District. A part of the Naga Hills under the British India control was coalesced into a district in 1866. The boundaries of the Naga Hills District were gradually expanded by annexation of the territories of several Naga ethnic groups, including the Aos (1889), the Semas (1904) and the Konyaks (1910). In 1912, the district was made part of Assam province. Following the Partition of India, it was merged with the Tuensang Division to create the state called Nagaland in 1963.

Geology: national geological monument

Nagahill Ophiolite Site (NHO) near Pungro in Kiphire district of Nagaland has been declared a National Geological Monument of India by the Geological Survey of India (GSI), for their protection, maintenance, promotion and enhancement of geotourism. These are the ophiolitic rocks of mantle and oceanic crust percentage at the Indian continental plate margin. These are a mixture of Mesozoic and subsequent Cenozoic rocks, i.e. magmatic, metamorphic and sedimentary rocks.

The Naga Hills, due to their complexity and position, forms a natural barrier between the two countries. The Naga Hills are part of the Arakan Range (Rakhine Range), which to the north rise to 12,552 feet.

See also
 Haflong Thrust
 Nagaland

Notes

External links
Burma - Geography
Google Books, The Physical Geography of Southeast Asia

Tourism in Nagaland
Tourism in Northeast India
Mountain ranges of India
Mountains of Nagaland
Mountain ranges of Myanmar
National Geological Monuments in India